The Hoofdklasse (Dutch, 'head class') is the second-highest league of amateur football in the Netherlands, and the fifth tier in general.

Hoofdklasse may also refer to:

Netherlands
Hoofdklasse (women), the second highest league of amateur women's football 
Men's Hoofdklasse Hockey, the men's top division of field hockey
Women's Hoofdklasse Hockey, the women's top division of field hockey
Hoofdklasse (cricket), the second highest domestic cricket competition
Hoofdklasse (korfball), the second highest echelon of korfball
Honkbal Hoofdklasse, the highest level of professional baseball
 Futsal Hoofdklasse (women), the second level women's futsal league

Suriname
SVB Hoofdklasse, the second division of Surinamese football

See also